The Umeå School of Business, Economics and Statistics, USBE, or Handelshögskolan vid Umeå Universitet, is the business school of Umeå University in the north of Sweden, founded in 1989 "to strengthen education in research and business while contributing to the community". About 2000 students currently study at USBE. The School offers one Bachelor program, four undergraduate programs (Civilekonomprogram), seven Master's degree programs (including the Erasmus Mundus Master Program in Strategic Project Management) and doctoral programs.

The International atmosphere is important to the business school and it offers one undergraduate program (the International Business Program) and all Master's programs and doctoral programs entirely in English. USBE also accept many international students as exchange or degree students.

USBE is located at the very heart of the University campus, a meeting-place for all academic disciplines, improving its opportunities to co-operate across traditional academic boundaries. It also gives USBE-students an opportunity to take an active part of student environment created for the 37 000 students at Umeå University.

Organization

Umeå School of Business, Economics and Statistics has three departments: the Department of Business Administration, the Department of Economics and the Department of Statistics.

USBE Career Center
USBE Career Center concentrates primarily on helping its graduates in the transition between graduation and the business world.

Research
Within the Umeå School of Business, Economics and Statistics, the Umeå Research Institute promotes research and awards funding to prospective researchers.
The School also hosts a group dedicated to research on decision-making in extreme environments. It is named Triple Ed (Research Group on Extreme Environments – Everyday Decisions).

Education

Master's programs
Master's Program in Accounting 
Master's Program in Finance 
Master's Program in Business Development and Internationalization
Master's Program in Management 
Master's Program in Marketing
Master's Program in Economics
Master's Program in Statistical Sciences
Masters in Strategic Project Management (European): offered jointly with Heriot-Watt University and Politecnico di Milano Erasmus Mundus

Undergraduate programs
International Business Program (in English)
Business Administration and Economics Program (in Swedish)
Retail and Supply Chain Management Program (in Swedish)
Service Managementprogramet (in Swedish)
Bachelor's Program in Statistics

Notable alumni

Students

 Linus Berg – founder and CEO of "Rest & Fly"
 Frida Berglund – founder of the popular blog "Husmusen"
 Wilhelm Geijer – former CEO and board member of Öhrlings PricewaterhouseCoopers
 Christian Hermelin – CEO, Fabege
 Leif Lindmark – former rector, Stockholm School of Economics 
 Agneta Marell – professor of business administration
 Henrik P. Molin – author
 Göran Carstedt – Leading the global network "Society for Organizational Learning"
 Malin Moström – Swedish woman footballer, nominated best in Sweden and the world
 Lars Petterson – CEO, Atea Sweden
 Erik Wikström – CEO, Pizzeria Viking chain

Honorary doctors

 Carl Kempe – Swedish businessman
 Robert H. Haveman – professor
 Lars Heikensten – former governor of the Swedish Riksbank

International partnerships 

USBE has over 70 partner universities all over the world, including:

See also

External links 
Umeå University official site
HHUS The Student Association at USBE

References

Educational institutions established in 1989
University departments in Sweden
Business schools in Sweden
Umeå University
1989 establishments in Sweden